Saint Teresa of Jesus Catholic University,, commonly known as the Catholic University of Ávila (UCAV), is a private, Catholic university, located in Ávila, Castile and León, Spain. It's named after Saint Teresa of Ávila.

The current rector of the university is Maria Rosario Sáez Yuguero.

History
On August 24, 1996, Antonio Cañizares Llovera, bishop of the diocese of Ávila, founded the university via a decree.  The university is named for the city and Teresa of Ávila.

In 2021, Forbes listed the Catholic University of Ávila among the 20 best universities of Spain.

Degrees
The Catholic University of Ávila offers degrees in business, law, and engineering.

Institute of Hispanic Studies
The Institute of Hispanic Studies at the university offers a summer program for students from other countries to study Spanish language, culture, and civilization.  The Institute offers a Catholic mysticism course, and through weekend trips, allows students to visit the cities of Segovia, Salamanca, Madrid, as well as important Carmelite sites like Fontiveros and Alba de Tormes.

References

External links

Institute of Hispanic Studies

Catholic universities and colleges in Spain
Universities in Castile and León
Educational institutions established in 1996
Ávila, Spain
Buildings and structures in Ávila, Spain
1996 establishments in Spain